The van Colster Baronetcy, of Amsterdam, was a title in the Baronetage of England. It was created on 28 February 1645 for Joseph van Colster, a Dutch citizen who resided at Fulham, Middlesex. The title became extinct on his death in 1665.

Van Colster baronets, of Amsterdam (1645)
Sir Joseph van Colster, 1st Baronet (died 1665)

References

Extinct baronetcies in the Baronetage of England
1645 establishments in England